Jaya Indravarman VI was the king of Champa from 1254 to 1257. He was the grandson of illustrious Jaya Harivarman I, and the younger brother of Jaya Paramesvaravarman II. "He was a very peaceful sovereign, given to 'all branches of knowledge and well versed in the philosophies of various schools'."  He was assassinated by Indravarman V, his nephew.

References 

Kings of Champa
Hindu monarchs
13th-century Vietnamese monarchs